Ragnvald Smedvik (8 September 1894 – 8 January 1975) was a Norwegian footballer. He played in eight matches for the Norway national football team from 1914 to 1916.

References

External links
 

1894 births
1975 deaths
Norwegian footballers
Norway international footballers
Place of birth missing
Association footballers not categorized by position